Volobuyevo is a rural locality in Kamyshinsky Selsoviet Rural Settlement, Kursky District, Kursk Oblast, Russia. Population:

Geography 
The village is located on the Tuskar River (a right tributary of the Seym), 107 km from the Russia–Ukraine border, 10 km north-east of the district center – the town Kursk, 7 km from the selsoviet center – Kamyshi.

 Climate
Volobuyevo has a warm-summer humid continental climate (Dfb in the Köppen climate classification).

Transport 
Volobuyevo is located 12 km from the federal route  Crimea Highway (a part of the European route ), 2 km from the road of regional importance  (Kursk – Ponyri), on the road of intermunicipal significance  (38K-018 – Volobuyevo – Kurkino), 1.5 km from the nearest railway halt 521 km (railway line Oryol – Kursk).

The rural locality is situated 13 km from Kursk Vostochny Airport, 138 km from Belgorod International Airport and 204 km from Voronezh Peter the Great Airport.

References

Notes

Sources

Rural localities in Kursky District, Kursk Oblast